The 2020 Missouri Democratic presidential primary took place on March 10, 2020, as one of several states voting the week after Super Tuesday in the Democratic Party primaries for the 2020 presidential election. The Missouri primary was an open primary, with the state awarding 79 delegates  towards the 2020 Democratic National Convention, of which 68 were pledged delegates allocated on the basis of the results of the primary.

Former vice president Joe Biden had won the primary by a landslide, taking around 60% of the vote, winning every county in the state and gaining 44 delegates, while senator Bernie Sanders received almost 35% of the vote and 24 delegates.

Procedure
Missouri was one of six states (along with Democrats Abroad) which held primaries on March 10, 2020, one week after Super Tuesday. Voting took place throughout the state from 6:00 a.m. until 7:00 p.m. In the open primary, candidates had to meet a threshold of 15 percent at the congressional district or statewide level in order to be considered viable. The 68 pledged delegates to the 2020 Democratic National Convention were allocated proportionally on the basis of the results of the primary. Of these, between 4 and 8 were allocated to each of the state's 8 congressional districts and another 9 were allocated to party leaders and elected officials (PLEO delegates), in addition to 15 at-large delegates. The March primary as part of Stage I on the primary timetable received no bonus delegates, in order to disperse the primaries between more different date clusters and keep too many states from hoarding on a March date.

Following ward, township, legislative district, and county mass meetings on April 9, 2020, during which district and state convention delegates were designated, district conventions on April 30, 2020 chose national convention district delegates. At the meeting of the Democratic state committee in Jefferson City on May 9, 2020, the 9 pledged PLEO delegates were voted on, while the 15 pledged at-large delegates should have been selected at the subsequent state convention in Columbia on June 20, 2020. However, due to the COVID-19 pandemic the state convention was held virtually between June 13 and June 19. The delegation also included 11 unpledged PLEO delegates: 8 members of the Democratic National Committee, 2 representatives from Congress, and former House Majority Leader Dick Gephardt.

Candidates 
The following individuals qualified for the ballot in Missouri:

Running

Joe Biden
Steve Burke
Roque "Rocky" De La Fuente III
Tulsi Gabbard
William C. Haas
Henry Hewes
Bernie Sanders
Leonard J. Steinman II
Velma Steinman
Robby Wells

Withdrawn

Michael Bennet
Michael Bloomberg
Cory Booker
Pete Buttigieg
Julian Castro
John Delaney
Amy Klobuchar
Deval Patrick
Tom Steyer
Elizabeth Warren
Marianne Williamson
Andrew Yang

There was also an uncommitted option on the ballot.

Polling

Results

See also
 2020 Missouri Republican presidential primary

Notes

References

External links
The Green Papers delegate allocation summary
Missouri Democratic Party delegate selection plan

Missouri Democratic
Democratic primary
2020